Barnacle Bill is a 1930 Fleischer Studios animated short film. It was part of the Talkartoons series, and featured Betty Boop (here known as Nancy Lee) and Bimbo (as "Barnacle Bill").

Plot

Barnacle Bill (Bimbo) is a sailor on a ship that has just come into port. As soon as he can get off the ship, he heads for Nancy Lee's (Betty Boop) house. When he gets there he begins knocking on her door. Bimbo and Betty begin singing the lyrics to a tame version of "Barnacle Bill the Sailor."  The actions of the film follow along the song's storyline, with Barnacle Bimbo romancing Betty and then leaving her to go back to sea.

Production notes
Like many early Fleischer Studios films, this film was inspired by a popular song, a version of "Barnacle Bill" written in 1928 by Frank Luther & Carson Robison and performed by Hoagy Carmichael. It has nothing to do with William Bernard, the sailor and California Gold Rush character known as "Barnacle Bill". Ironically, Fleischer Studios also produced a Popeye cartoon, Beware of Barnacle Bill in 1935, using the same song as aforementioned, almost 5 years after Betty Boop cartoon,  Barnacle Bill was released, with Bluto as Barnacle Bill the Sailor portraited the character after Bimbo.

In this cartoon, Betty Boop still retains some of the canine physical characteristics that she had in her first screen appearance, Dizzy Dishes.

References

External links
 

1930 short films
1930s American animated films
1930 animated films
1930s animated short films
Betty Boop cartoons
American black-and-white films
Paramount Pictures short films
Fleischer Studios short films
Short films directed by Dave Fleischer
Films about the California Gold Rush
Films based on songs
American animated short films
1930s English-language films